Lee Ki-hyuk (born 7 July 2000) is a South Korean footballer currently playing as a midfielder for Jeju United and the South Korea national team.

Career statistics

Club

References

External links
 

2000 births
Living people
South Korean footballers
South Korea youth international footballers
Association football midfielders
K League 1 players
Suwon FC players